Stripes is a 1981 American war comedy film directed by Ivan Reitman and starring Bill Murray, Harold Ramis, Warren Oates, P. J. Soles, Sean Young, and John Candy. Ramis wrote the film with Len Blum and Dan Goldberg, the latter of whom also served as producer alongside Reitman. Numerous actors, including John Larroquette, John Diehl, Conrad Dunn, Judge Reinhold, Joe Flaherty, Dave Thomas, Timothy Busfield, and Bill Paxton, appear in the film in some of the earliest roles of their careers. The film's score was composed by Elmer Bernstein.

Murray stars as John Winger, an immature taxi driver who, after losing his job and his girlfriend, decides to enlist in the United States Army with his friend Russell Ziskey (Ramis). The film received generally positive reviews from critics and audiences, and was a commercial success.

Plot

In the course of one day, Louisville cab driver John Winger loses his job, his apartment, his car, and his girlfriend Anita, who has grown tired of his immaturity. Realizing his limited prospects, he decides to join the Army and persuades best friend Russell Ziskey, a vocational ESL teacher, to join as well. The two visit a recruiting office and are soon sent off to basic training. 

Upon arrival, they meet their fellow recruits and their drill sergeant, Sergeant Hulka. Following in-processing, the recruits introduce themselves and explain their reasons for enlisting. One of them, the overweight Dewey "Ox" Oxberger, wants to slim down and be respected by his fellow trainees and women in general. John irritates Hulka with his slacker attitude, and he and Russell become romantically involved with MPs Louise Cooper and Stella Hansen.

After Hulka discovers that John and Russell have briefly gone AWOL, Russell confesses his mistake, but John keeps silent. Hulka orders Russell to scrub garbage cans for 24 hours and gives the rest of the platoon two weeks of KP duty. In the latrine, Hulka privately tells John that he will never make a good soldier and invites John to attack him. When John throws a punch, Hulka dodges and hits him in the stomach, then suggests that John think about the encounter.

That night, Russell catches John attempting to flee back to Louisville and stops him, angrily reminding John that it was his idea that they both enlist. Louise and Stella find them fighting and drive them back to their barracks without reporting them. John honors Russell's request for both of them to continue basic training.

As graduation approaches, Hulka is injured when the haughty and dull-witted Captain Stillman, the recruit company's commanding officer, orders a mortar crew to fire without first setting target coordinates. Later, members of Hulka's platoon sneak off base and visit a mud wrestling bar, where John persuades Ox to compete with a group of women. When MPs and police raid the club, Stella and Louise help John and Russell escape. The rest of the platoon are returned to base, where Stillman reprimands them for being arrested and threatens to report them to the base commander, General Barnicke, and make them repeat basic training.

John and Russell have sex with Stella and Louise, then return to base. John motivates the disheartened platoon with a speech and begins preparing them for graduation. After a night of practice, they oversleep and wake up an hour late for the ceremony. They rush to the parade ground, where John leads them in an unorthodox but highly coordinated drill display. Impressed upon learning that they completed their training without a drill sergeant, Barnicke assigns them to a secret project he is overseeing in Italy.

Upon arrival in Italy, the platoon is reunited with a recovered Hulka and tasked with guarding the EM-50 Urban Assault Vehicle, an armored personnel carrier disguised as a recreational vehicle. John and Russell steal it to visit Stella and Louise, who are stationed in West Germany. When Stillman finds the vehicle missing, he launches an unauthorized mission to retrieve it, against Hulka's objections. 

Stillman inadvertently leads the platoon across the border into Czechoslovakia. Hulka jumps from their truck before the Soviet Army captures it, and sends out a radio distress call that John and Russell hear. Realizing that their platoon is in danger, John, Russell, Stella, and Louise take the EM-50 and infiltrate the Soviet base where the platoon is being held, and rescue them with aid from Hulka.

Upon returning to the US, John, Russell, Louise, Stella, and Hulka are hailed as heroes, and are each awarded the Distinguished Service Cross. Hulka retires and opens a restaurant franchise; John, Russell, Ox, Louise, and Stella are featured  in various magazines; and Stillman is reassigned to a weather station near Nome, Alaska.

Cast

 Bill Murray as John Winger
 Harold Ramis as Russell Ziskey
 Warren Oates as Sergeant Hulka
 P. J. Soles as Stella Hansen
 Sean Young as Louise Cooper
 John Candy as Dewey 'Ox' Oxberger
 John Larroquette as Captain Stillman
 Roberta Leighton as Anita
 John Voldstad as Stillman's Aide
 John Diehl as Howard 'Cruiser' J. Turkstra
 Lance LeGault as Colonel Glass
 Conrad Dunn as Francis 'Psycho' Soyer
 Judge Reinhold as Elmo Blum
 Joe Flaherty as Border Guard
 Dave Thomas as M.C.
 Robert J. Wilke as General Barnicke
 Antone Pagán as Hector
 Bill Paxton as Unnamed Soldier
 Timothy Busfield as Mortar Soldier

Production

Development
En route to the premiere of Meatballs, Ivan Reitman conceived an idea for a film: "Cheech and Chong join the army".  He pitched Stripes to Paramount Pictures, who immediately greenlit the film. Len Blum and Dan Goldberg wrote the screenplay in Toronto and read it to Reitman, who was in Los Angeles, over the phone, who in turn would give the writers notes. Cheech and Chong's manager thought the script was very funny; however, the comedy duo wanted complete creative control. Reitman then suggested to Goldberg that they change the two main characters to ones suited for Bill Murray and Harold Ramis, figuring that if they could interest Ramis and let him tailor the script for the two of them, he could convince Murray to do it.

Casting
Ramis had already co-written National Lampoon's Animal House, Meatballs, and Caddyshack, but was relatively unknown as a film actor. His best-known acting work prior to Stripes was as a cast member for the late-night TV sketch comedy Second City Television, which he had quit a few years earlier. Columbia Pictures did not like Ramis's audition but Reitman told the studio that he was hiring the comedian anyway. P. J. Soles reported that Dennis Quaid had read for the role of Russell and that Ramis was reluctant to appear in the film, but that Murray told Ramis he did not wish to work with anyone else and would leave the film unless he played the other principal.

Casting director Karen Rea saw Conrad Dunn on the stage and asked him to read for the role of Francis "Psycho" Soyer in New York. Judge Reinhold played Elmo, who was given the best jokes from the Cheech and Chong draft of the screenplay. Sean Young was cast based on her looks, and Reitman felt that her "sweetness" would go well with Ramis. According to Reitman, Kim Basinger agreed to play Stella but her agent demanded way too much money. P. J. Soles tested with Murray and they got along well together. John Diehl had never auditioned before and won his first paying job as an actor. Goldberg knew John Candy from Toronto and told Reitman that he should be in the film; he was not required to audition.

Reitman was a fan of the Westerns that Warren Oates had been in and wanted someone who was strong and whom everyone respected to control the film's misfit platoon. Reinhold said that during filming Oates would tell stories about working on films like The Wild Bunch and they would be enthralled. Reitman wanted "a little bit of weight in the center", and added the argument between Hulka and Winger. It was not played for laughs and allowed Murray to do a serious scene, something he had not done before. During filming one of the obstacle courses scenes, Reitman told the actors to grab Oates and drag him into the mud without telling the veteran actor about it to see what would happen and get a genuine reaction. Oates' front tooth got chipped in the process and he yelled at Reitman for what he did.

Filming
Every scene had some element of improvisation due in large part to Murray and Ramis. Much of the mud wrestling scene was made up on the spot by Reitman. Candy felt uncomfortable during filming, but Reitman talked him through it. The spatula scene in the kitchen of the general's house was filmed at three in the morning, after the cast and crew had been up the entire day. Murray improvised the "Aunt Jemima Treatment" sequence and Soles reacted naturally to whatever he said and did.

Filming began in Kentucky in November 1980, then moved to California in December. Principal photography ended on Stage 20 at Burbank Studios on January 29, 1981. The production was allowed to shoot the army scenes at Fort Knox, the city scenes in Louisville, and the Czechoslovakia scenes at the closed Chapeze Distillery (owned by Jim Beam) in Clermont, with a budget of $9–10million and a 42-day shooting schedule. Reitman, Goldberg, and Ramis were involved in a detailed negotiation with the Department of Defense to make the film conducive to the recruiting needs of the military, in exchange for subsidies in the form of free labor and location and equipment access.

Dunn remembered Candy inviting the men in the platoon to his house while filming was under way, for a homemade spaghetti dinner and to watch the famous Sugar Ray Leonard vs. Roberto Durán II No Más Fight (November 25, 1980). He recalled that he and Candy were the only two cast members who knew the lyrics to the song "Doo Wah Diddy" and taught them to the rest of the company. "I really enjoyed playing Psycho", he said.

In 1993 Murray reflected, "I'm still a little queasy that I actually made a movie where I carry a machine gun. But I felt if you were rescuing your friends it was okay. It wasn't Reds or anything, but it captured what it was like on an Army base: It was cold, you had to wear the same green clothes, you had to do a lot of physical stuff, you got treated pretty badly, and had bad coffee."

The EM-50 Urban Assault Vehicle "was built from a 1973-1978-era GMC Motorhome," but no one knows what exact year it was. It was designed to resemble "a family Winnebago — with a nice color scheme and user-friendly interior — but came with bulletproof shields and flamethrowers."

Reception

Box office
Stripes was released on June 26, 1981, and grossed $1,892,000 in 1,074 screens on opening day. It placed fifth overall for the weekend with $6,152,166. It eventually grossed $85,297,000 in North America, making it the fifth most popular 1981 film at the US and Canadian box office.

Critical response
Stripes was well received by critics and audiences. On review aggregator website Rotten Tomatoes, the film has an approval rating of 88% based on 40 reviews, with a rating average of 6.6/10. The website's critical consensus reads: "A raucous military comedy that features Bill Murray and his merry cohorts approaching the peak of their talents." On Metacritic — which assigns a weighted mean score — the film has a score of 68 out of 100 based on 14 critics, indicating "generally favorable reviews".

In his Chicago Sun-Times review, Roger Ebert praised it as "an anarchic slob movie, a celebration of all that is irreverent, reckless, foolhardy, undisciplined, and occasionally scatological. It's a lot of fun." Janet Maslin of The New York Times called it "a lazy but amiable comedy" and praised Murray for achieving "a sardonically exaggerated calm that can be very entertaining".

Gary Arnold, in his review for The Washington Post, wrote, "Stripes squanders at least an hour belaboring situations contradicted from the outset by Murray's personality. The premise and star remain out of whack until the rambling, diffuse screenplay finally struggles beyond basic training." Time wrote, "Stripes will keep potential felons off the streets for two hours. Few people seem to be asking, these days, that movies do more."

Home media
Stripes was released on VHS by RCA/Columbia Pictures Home Video.

The film was released on DVD on June 7, 2005, a release which includes both the original theatrical cut and an extended cut that runs about 18 minutes longer than the theatrical cut. Extra features include six deleted scenes; audio commentary by Reitman and Goldberg; an hour-long documentary titled "Stars & Stripes" that includes the reminiscences of the screenwriters, Reitman, Diehl, Laroquette, Murray, Reinhold, Soles and Young; and the original trailer.

The extended cut expands on several scenes and includes an excised subplot in which Winger and Ziskey (who takes six hits of Elmo's LSD under the impression that it is Dramamine) go AWOL by stowing away on a special forces paratrooper mission. They become lost in a jungle and are captured by Spanish-speaking guerrillas. They are taken to camp and nearly shot before Winger saves the day by singing the chorus of Tito Rodriguez's "Quando, Quando, Quando", effectively winning over their captors. Winger and Ziskey then leave and rejoin the special forces unit as it is re-boarding the plane. Other deleted scenes include a longer sequence of Winger talking Ziskey into joining the Army with him; Captain Stillman being called out as a liar by Winger when he blames another officer for his neglect in the mortar incident that injured Sgt. Hulka; Hulka giving everyone but John and Russell the weekend off in Italy while assigning them to guard and clean the EM-50, explaining cheerfully that his only reason for doing so is that he doesn't like John; and Russell saying he won't go rescue the platoon because he doesn't want to kill OR die while John warms up to the idea of mounting a rescue via the EM-50. The last two deleted scenes notably have John Winger being told that the platoon members dislike him (directly by Hulka, and indirectly by Russell when he tells John that the platoon hates his guts) which is in contrast to the positive reactions to Winger in the final act of the theatrically-released film.

In January 2012, the extended cut of the film was released on Blu-ray.

Re-release
For the 40th anniversary of the film's release, Stripes re-opened in theaters on August 29 to September 2, 2021, with a special introduction from Bill Murray and Ivan Reitman.

See also

 Ghostbusters – a 1984 comedy film also directed by Reitman, starring Murray and Ramis, and scored by Bernstein

Notes

References

External links

 Stripes at the AFI Catalog of Feature Films
 
 
 

1980s action comedy films
1980s adventure comedy films
1980s buddy comedy films
1980s war comedy films
1981 films
American action comedy films
American adventure comedy films
American buddy comedy films
American war comedy films
American war films
Cold War films
Columbia Pictures films
Czechoslovakia in fiction
1980s English-language films
Films about the United States Army
Films directed by Ivan Reitman
Films scored by Elmer Bernstein
Films set in 1981
Films set in Kentucky
Films set in Italy
Films set in West Germany
Films set in Czechoslovakia
Films shot in California
Films shot in Kentucky
Military humor in film
Films with screenplays by Harold Ramis
Films produced by Ivan Reitman
1981 comedy films
1980s American films